Ritteri anemone is a common name for two species of sea anemone. It may refer to:

 Heteractis aurora
 Heteractis magnifica